The Plague Maiden ( a.k.a. The Maid of Pestilence), is the name given to an apparition from a Lithuanian-Polish folktale. She was said to appear before a plague befell a town. She is often described as waving a red handkerchief through victim's doors, either because it is dyed that way or because it is soaked with blood. Some folktales say that she wears white and has a fiery wreath across her temples.

A popular ballad told the tale of a man who killed the plague maiden using a sword inscribed with the names of Jesus and the Virgin Mary and stole her handkerchief. At the end of the ballad, though the man and his family die, their town is never again touched by plague. The red handkerchief was supposedly kept at the town church, but the location is never named.

The legend was mentioned by Adam Mickiewicz in his poem Konrad Wallenrod.

References

Bibliography
 
 
 
 

Polish folklore
Lithuanian folklore characters
Black Death
Supernatural legends
Religion and plague